In mathematics, specifically functional analysis, a Banach space is said to have the approximation property (AP), if every compact operator is a limit of finite-rank operators. The converse is always true.

Every Hilbert space has this property. There are, however, Banach spaces which do not; Per Enflo published the first counterexample in a 1973 article. However, much work in this area was done by Grothendieck (1955).

Later many other counterexamples were found. The space of bounded operators on  does not have the approximation property.

Definition 
A locally convex topological vector space X is said to have the approximation property, if the identity map can be approximated, uniformly on precompact sets, by continuous linear maps of finite rank. 

For a locally convex space X, the following are equivalent:
 X has the approximation property;
where  denotes the space of continuous linear operators from X to Y endowed with the topology of uniform convergence on pre-compact subsets of X. 

If X is a Banach space this requirement becomes that for every compact set  and every , there is an operator  of finite rank so that , for every .

Related definitions 
Some other flavours of the AP are studied:

Let  be a Banach space and let .

A Banach space is said to have metric approximation property (MAP), if it is 1-AP.

A Banach space is said to have compact approximation property (CAP), if in the
definition of AP an operator of finite rank is replaced with a compact operator.

Examples 

 Every subspace of an arbitrary product of Hilbert spaces possesses the approximation property.  In particular,
 every Hilbert space has the approximation property. 
 every projective limit of Hilbert spaces, as well as any subspace of such a projective limit, possesses the approximation property. 
 every nuclear space possesses the approximation property.
 Every separable Frechet space that contains a Schauder basis possesses the approximation property. 
 Every space with a Schauder basis has the AP (we can use the projections associated to the base as the 's in the definition), thus many spaces with the AP can be found. For example, the  spaces, or the symmetric Tsirelson space.

References

Bibliography
 
 Enflo, P.: A counterexample to the approximation property in Banach spaces. Acta Math. 130, 309–317(1973).
 Grothendieck, A.: Produits tensoriels topologiques et espaces nucleaires. Memo. Amer. Math. Soc. 16 (1955).
 
 Paul R. Halmos, "Has progress in mathematics slowed down?" Amer. Math. Monthly 97 (1990), no. 7, 561—588. 
 William B. Johnson "Complementably universal separable Banach spaces" in Robert G. Bartle (ed.),  1980  Studies in functional analysis,  Mathematical Association of America.
 Kwapień, S. "On Enflo's example of a Banach space without the approximation property". Séminaire Goulaouic–Schwartz 1972—1973: Équations aux dérivées partielles et analyse fonctionnelle, Exp. No. 8, 9 pp. Centre de Math., École Polytech., Paris, 1973.  
 Lindenstrauss, J.; Tzafriri, L.: Classical Banach Spaces I, Sequence spaces, 1977.
 
 
 Karen Saxe, Beginning Functional Analysis, Undergraduate Texts in Mathematics, 2002 Springer-Verlag, New York.
  
 Singer, Ivan. Bases in Banach spaces. II. Editura Academiei Republicii Socialiste România, Bucharest; Springer-Verlag, Berlin-New York, 1981. viii+880 pp. . 

Operator theory
Banach spaces